Sergi López i Ayats (born 22 December 1965) is a Spanish actor mostly known for his work on Dirty Pretty Things, Solo mía, and Pan's Labyrinth. He has developed a substantial career in both Spanish films and French films.

Early life
Sergi López was initiated in theater in representations of typical nativity plays called Els Pastorets, in his native city. He started to study theater in Barcelona but completed his studies in France, in the school of Jacques Lecoq.  He is fluent in Catalan, Spanish, French and English.

Career
In 1991, he auditioned for French director Manuel Poirier. López made his film debut that year in Poirier's La Petite amie d'Antonio (1992). López did eight more films with Poirier, including his first international success, Western (1997).The film was entered into the 1997 Cannes Film Festival where it won the Jury Prize., and was nominated for an Oscar; López himself was nominated for the César Award. In  2000, he won the Cesar for Best Actor for his role in the French film Harry, un ami qui vous veut du bien.

In 1997, he starred in Caresses, directed by fellow Catalan Ventura Pons. His resume includes films such as Dirty Pretty Things, Solo mía, and Pan's Labyrinth.

In 2005, he returned to the stage to perform a monologue in Non solum, which he wrote and directed with Jorge Picó.

Selected filmography

Theatre
 Brams o la kumèdia dels errors
 Fins al fons
 Lisistrata (1996)
 Non Solum (2005)

References

External links

1965 births
Living people
European Film Award for Best Actor winners
People from Vilanova i la Geltrú
Best Actor César Award winners
Male stage actors from Catalonia
Male film actors from Catalonia
Spanish male stage actors
20th-century Spanish male actors
21st-century Spanish male actors
Spanish male film actors